Benja Razafimahaleo is a Malagasy politician who served as Minister of Finance in the government of Madagascar from March 2009 to September 2009.

LEADER-Fanilo
Razafimahaleo is the brother of Herizo Razafimahaleo, who was President of the LEADER-Fanilo political party and a major political figure from the 1990s until his death in 2008. Benja was Director-General of Sacimem for a time. Following Herizo's death, LEADER-Fanilo's national council chose Manassé Esoavelomandroso as the party's National President in early September 2008, while Benja Razafimahaleo was chosen as one of four vice-presidents.

2009 political crisis
Razafimahaleo was appointed as Minister of Finance and the Budget in the rival government of opposition leader Andry Rajoelina on 10 February 2009. As the political crisis involving Rajoelina and President Marc Ravalomanana escalated, Rajoelina's supporters installed Razafimahaleo in the Finance Ministry with the help of the military on 12 March 2009. Rajoelina took over the Presidency with the military's assistance a few days later.

Razafimahaleo was dismissed from the government on 8 September 2009.

References

Finance ministers of Madagascar
Malagasy politicians
Living people
Year of birth missing (living people)